is a Japanese manga series written and illustrated by Mitsuharu Yanamoto. It was serialized in Shogakukan's  seinen manga magazine Big Comic Superior from August 2014 to October 2019, with its chapters collected in 13 tankōbon volumes.

A live-action film adaptation, starring Keyakizaka46's Yurina Hirate as Hibiki, was released in September 2018.

As of October 2019, Hibiki: Shōsetsuka ni Naru Hōhō had over 2.3 million copies in circulatioin. The manga won the 10th Manga Taishō award in 2017 and the 64th Shogakukan Manga Award for the general category in 2019.

Plot
The staff of a literary magazine worries about the poor state of the book publishing industry. A handwritten manuscript is sent to their newcomer's contest. Since the contest only accepts web submissions, the manuscript is supposed to be thrown away, but it catches the eye of an editor called Hanai. The manuscript is under the name "Hibiki Akui", but has no contact address.  
Meanwhile, an eccentric girl called Hibiki is entering high school and decides to join the school's literature club.

Media

Manga
Hibiki: Shōsetsuka ni Naru Hōhō, written and illustrated by Mitsuharu Yanamoto, was serialized in Shogakukan's seinen manga magazine Big Comic Superior from August 22, 2014 to October 11, 2019. Shogakukan collected its chapters in thirteen tankōbon volumes, released from February 27, 2015 to November 29, 2019.

Volume list

Live-action film
A live-action film adaptation, starring Yurina Hirate as Hibiki, was released on September 14, 2018.

Reception
As of October 2019, the manga had over 2.3 million copies in circulation.

The manga ranked 12th in the 2016 edition of Takarajimasha's Kono Manga ga Sugoi! guidebook for male readers. The manga was nominated for the 10th Manga Taishō awards in 2017; and respectively won the award. In 2019, the manga, along with Kenkō de Bunkateki na Saitei Gendo no Seikatsu, won the 64th Shogakukan Manga Award for the general category.

See also
Ryū to Ichigo – another manga series by the same author

References

External links
  
 

Live-action films based on manga
Manga adapted into films
Manga Taishō
Seinen manga
Shogakukan manga
Toho films
Winners of the Shogakukan Manga Award for general manga
Works about writers
Japanese drama films